Helga Deen (6 April 1925 – 16 July 1943) was a Jewish diarist whose diary was discovered in 2004, which describes her stay in a Dutch prison camp, Kamp Vught, where she was brought during World War II at the age of 18.

Biography 
Deen was half-Dutch. Initially her father lived with his German GP wife in Germany, but moved back to the Netherlands as persecution increased. Her mother worked for a time as a doctor at a concentration camp at Vught. She was given leave to remain but chose to accompany her family to Sobibor, where she became one of the millions who was murdered in the Nazis' gas chambers.

After her last diary entry, in early July 1943, Helga Deen was deported to Sobibór extermination camp and murdered in the gas chambers shortly after she arrived in the camp. She was 18 years old.

Diary
Upon her arrival at Camp Vught in April 1943, she started writing in her diary, a school notebook. Deen wrote the diary for her boyfriend, Kees van den Berg, who kept it hidden after the war. After his death, his son presented the diary to archivists in Tilburg.

Memorials
A memorial stone to Helga and her family has been placed by a member of the Dutch Sobibor Foundation on the pathway which used to lead to the gas chambers (called the "Road to Heaven").

See also
 List of posthumous publications of Holocaust victims
 List of Holocaust diarists
 Anne Frank
 Etty Hillesum
 David Koker
 Selma Wijnberg-Engel

References

External links
Helga Deen at Virtual Jewish Community of Netherlands record
Helga Deen, the Last Night, a 32-page graphic novel created by Dario Picciau and Roberto Malini
Stichting sobibor.nl, click on 'gedenklaan' and 'links' to view the images

1925 births
1943 deaths
Writers from Szczecin
German Jews who died in the Holocaust
Dutch Jews who died in the Holocaust
Dutch civilians killed in World War II
Dutch diarists
German diarists
People from the Province of Pomerania
Dutch people who died in Sobibor extermination camp
German people who died in Sobibor extermination camp
Women diarists
20th-century German women writers
Jewish women writers
Holocaust diarists
Dutch people executed in Nazi concentration camps
People killed by gas chamber by Nazi Germany
German emigrants to the Netherlands